The 1941 Western Michigan Broncos football team was an American football team that represented Michigan College of Education (later renamed Western Michigan University) during the 1941 college football season. In their 13th and final season under head coach Mike Gary, the Hilltoppers compiled an 8–0 record, shut out four opponents, and outscored all opponents by a combined total of 183 to 27. The team played its home games at Waldo Stadium in Kalamazoo, Michigan.

End Bob Metzger was the team captain. For the second consecutive year, halfback Horace Coleman received the team's most outstanding player award.

With the United States entry into World War II after the Attack on Pearl Harbor, Mike Gary left his position as head football coach at Western Michigan and served three years in the Naval Air Corps with the rank of commander.

Schedule

References

Western Michigan
Western Michigan Broncos football seasons
College football undefeated seasons
Western Michigan Broncos football